Russell Dove (22 September 1928 – 19 April 2016) was an Australian sports shooter. He competed in the 50 metre rifle, prone event at the 1972 Summer Olympics.

References

1928 births
2016 deaths
Australian male sport shooters
Olympic shooters of Australia
Shooters at the 1972 Summer Olympics
Place of birth missing